William Thomas Clement (1820 – January 1864) was an English cricketer.

Clement made a single first-class appearance for Hampshire against an All England Eleven in 1845. In his only first-class match Clement scored 5 runs.

External links
W. Clement at Cricinfo
W. Clement at CricketArchive

English cricketers
Hampshire cricketers
1820 births
1864 deaths
People from Chawton